The National Socialist League of the Reich for Physical Exercise (abbreviated NSRL) was the umbrella organization for sports and physical education in Nazi Germany. The NSRL was known as the German League of the Reich for Physical Exercise (abbreviated DRL) until 1938. The organization was expanded to Austria after that country's annexation by Nazi Germany.

The NSRL was led by the Reichssportführer, who after 1934 simultaneously presided over the German National Olympic Committee. The NSRL's leaders were Hans von Tschammer und Osten (1933–1943), Arno Breitmeyer (1943–1944) and Karl Ritter von Halt (1944–1945).

History

Preliminary organizations: Effects of the Nazi takeover
The 1916 Summer Olympics had been awarded to Berlin, but were canceled because of the duration of World War I. The Deutscher Reichsausschuss für Olympische Spiele (DRA or DRAfOS) "German Imperial Commission for Olympic Games", was the German Olympic Sports organization at that time. In 1917 the "German Imperial Commission for Olympic Games" was renamed Deutscher Reichsausschuss für Leibesübungen (DRA, sometimes also DRL or, more rarely, DRAfL: "German Imperial Commission for Physical Exercise"). The name change reflected Germany's protest against the fact that Germany and other Central Powers were being excluded from the "Olympic family" which was dominated by the Entente Powers.

The Deutscher Reichsausschuss für Leibesübungen was led by Theodor Lewald and Carl Diem was its Secretary General. Even though it saw itself as the pan-German umbrella organization for sports, it did not represent all types of sports and sports associations of Germany. A great number of sport clubs, especially those stemming from industrial workers' background, had not joined the DRA.

After the Enabling Act, which legally gave Hitler dictatorial control of Germany in March 1933, all sports organizations connected to the Social Democratic Party, the Communist Party, and even to the church, were banned. This ban affected especially the sports clubs of industrial workers, most of which were called to split up on their own (Selbstauflösung) before the first semester of 1933 was over. The more conservative nationalistic and bourgeois clubs were allowed to subsist into the following year.

On April 12, 1933 Theodor Lewald gave in to the Nazi authorities and resigned as leader of the German Sports Office after it was revealed his paternal grandmother was Jewish. The Nazi minister of the interior, Wilhelm Frick, interfered with the process of the election of a new Sports leader, and the decision was made by a hurriedly instituted three-man commission. Thus, in April 1933, Hans von Tschammer und Osten, a figure formerly unknown in German sports, was named Reichskommissar für Turnen und Sport (Commissioner for Gymnastics and Sports of the Reich). Von Tschammer, however, would keep his predecessor in a high position in the sports body, and years later he would appoint Theodor Lewald as president of the Organizing Committee of the Berlin Olympic Games.

Hans von Tschammer und Osten was a SA group leader and promoter of Nazism. In the name of gleichschaltung he disbanded the Deutscher Reichsausschuss für Leibesübungen on May 5, 1933 (officially on May 10). Von Tschammer was then elevated to Reichssportführer on July 19 and the whole sports sphere in Germany was placed under his power.

Sports and propaganda in Nazi Germany: The Aryan ideal
The Deutscher Reichsbund für Leibesübungen (DRL) was established on July 27, 1934, as the official Sports governing body of Nazi Germany. It would quickly become a formidable system within the German nation.

After the DRL's foundation all other German sport associations gradually lost their freedom and were coopted into the DRL as mere units ("Fachämter"). Even the most prestigious ones, like the German Football Association (DFB) lost their independence. Von Tschammer's goal was to build a formidable Nazi sports body to which all German sports associations would be submitted. His vision was that physical exercise would "improve the morale and productivity of German workers" as well as making sports a source of national pride for the Germans. Sporting skills were made a criterion for school graduation as well as a necessary qualification for certain jobs and admission to universities.
Among the controversial measures taken by the Sports Office of the Reich at the time, the staging of the massive Reichssportfest event on Trinity Sunday was a decision that shocked devout Catholics.

In 1935 journalist Guido von Mengden, was named public relations officer of the Reich Sports Office. He became the personal advisor and consultant of the Reichssportführer in 1936, and subsequently became the chief editor of NS-Sport, the official organ of the Reich Sports Office.
Other DRL/NSRL publications included Dietwart, a sports magazine with excellent illustrations and Sport und Staat (Sports and State), a massive four-volume Nazi propaganda report on the organized sports activities in Nazi Germany. Sport und Staat was made by Arno Breitmeyer and Hitler's personal photographer Heinrich Hoffmann. This lavishly illustrated work had many pictures and information about the various Nazi organizations, i.e. SA, NSKK, Bund Deutscher Mädel, Hitler Jugend, etc. Printed in 1934 by the publishing house of the German Sports Aid Funds, a branch of the DRL, only volume one and two of a planned series of four volumes were published.

The aims of the promotion of sports in Nazi Germany included hardening the spirit of every German as well as making German citizens feel that they were part of a wider national purpose. This was in line with the ideals of Friedrich Ludwig Jahn, the "Father of physical exercises", who connected the steeling of one's own body to a healthy spirit and promoted the idea of a unified, strong Germany. A more controversial aim was the demonstration of Aryan physical superiority.

Von Tschammer's impressively staged events of sports pageantry not only enhanced the physical activity, but also the nationalism of Germans. Nordic aesthetic beauty and commitment to Germanic ideals of race went hand in hand during the Nazi era, and von Tschammer und Osten implemented a policy of racial exclusion within sports. Athletes of Jewish origin were excluded from participation in relevant sporting events.

1936 Olympic Games: Zenith of the Nazi Sports Office
In 1936 Hans von Tschammer und Osten, as the head of the Deutscher Reichsbund für Leibesübungen, played a major role in the structure and coordination of the Summer Olympics in Berlin. The Olympic Games, the first in history to have live television coverage, provided an ideal setting to showcase the Nazi regime and what Hitler deemed to be his exploits.

As Secretary General of the Organizing Committee of the Berlin Olympic Games, Carl Diem, the former secretary of the Deutscher Reichsausschuss für Leibesübungen (DRA), the forerunner of the DRL/NSRL, became the chief organizer of the Berlin Olympic Games. Diem held high posts in the Reichs Sports office even after the Olympics, being named leader of the Foreign Department of the Nationalsocialist Sports Office in 1939 by the Reichssportführer. As such Carl Diem was responsible for the issues of German athletes in foreign countries, as well as for the international affairs of the NSRL.

Von Tschammer trusted the organization of the Fourth Winter Olympics in Garmisch-Partenkirchen to Karl Ritter von Halt, whom he named President of the Committee for the organization of the Winter Games. As a result of the prestige acquired in this event, Karl Ritter von Halt would be elected member of the Executive Committee of the International Olympic Committee (IOC) in 1937, a post von Tschammer craved but was not able to obtain.

The German eagle with the swastika on the chest, worn as a badge by the athletes of the 1936 German Olympics team, became the official symbol of the Nazi Sports Body; "the swastika on the eagle's chest displays ... the ideology of the DRL" ("Das Hakenkreuz aber, welches der Adler in seinen Schwingen trägt, bekennt, aus welcher Gesinnung ... im DRL gearbeitet wird).
The verbal salutation "Heil Hitler!" was introduced by von Tschammer on December 12, 1936 as the official formal salutation by members of German sport organisations in the sport events that would be organized from that date onwards. The Nazi salute had already been introduced three years before by Josef Klein. On March 17, 1937, all German athletes were called by Hans von Tschammer und Osten to join the Hitler Youth.

In 1937 two cricket (Germanized into "Kricket" by the DRL) matches between a German team and a British team from Worcester took place in Berlin.

Expansion of Germany: Beginning of the decline
Austria's annexation by Germany in March 1938 brought the budding Austrian Nationalliga to an early end. Numerous football teams were disbanded and some players fled the country. All Austrian sports associations were absorbed by the system of the DRL as Gau XVII section under Gaufachwart Hans Janisch. The Hitler salute was introduced as compulsory before and after every game. Finally, the operation of junior sports teams was handed over to the local Hitlerjugend units.

Despised by Nazis as unworthy of a true German, professionalism in sports was outlawed by the DRL in May 1938. Felix Linnemann, the German Football Association (DFB) president, was one of the greatest campaigners for amateurism in sports in Nazi Germany. In 1940, the already powerless German Football Association was finally wound up.

Following the 1938 Munich Agreement and the liquidation of Czechoslovakia as a state, the ethnic Sudeten German football teams played in the Gauliga Sudetenland. The NSRL formed two groups in 1939, which were raised to three in 1941. None of these teams were able to make it to the final stages of the German football champions. Czech clubs continued to play their own Bohemia/Moravia championship A separate Gauliga for the Czech teams of the territories occupied by Germany, Gauliga Böhmen und Mähren, was formed by the NSRL in 1943.

The last big sports event organized in its trademark grandiose style by the NSRL was the Deutsches Turn- und Sportfest (German Gym and Sports Celebration) in Breslau (now Wrocław) in July 1938. This highly nationalistic sports event commemorated the 125th anniversary of the German Wars of Liberation against Napoleon and the first award of the Iron Cross in the city of Breslau itself in 1813.

On December the 21st 1938, a decree was issued by Adolf Hitler changing the name of the Reich Sports Body to Nationalsozialistischer Reichsbund für Leibesübungen (NSRL), thereby "elevating it to an organization served by the NSDAP". This name change meant that the NSRL would be "placed under" the Nazi Party. Its seat would be the Haus des Deutschen Sports (House of the German Sports) in the Reichssportfeld (Sports Field of the Reich) in Berlin.

Twilight and end of the Nazi Sports Office

World War II radically altered the role of the NSRL in Germany and the areas under its leadership. The military re-armament and dire war preparations would make the influence of physical exercises in Nazi German society wane in favour of militarism. The massive sports pageantry events in the large cities, carefully organized to arouse nationalistic fervor, were replaced by military parades of German warriors. Successful sportsmen found it increasingly difficult to compete with frontline war heroes in capturing the attention of the German public.

Even though the NSRL continued playing a big role in sporting activities among the youth for a few years, the atmosphere had changed. Many Germans were subjected to conscription and left for the different fronts, so the NSRL concentrated in training and staging local or regional events for younger athletes. Already in 1940 monetary funds for organizing sporting venues, such as the prestigious Kiel Week sailing competition, were not forthcoming. Contributors felt emboldened to deny funds to the formerly influential branches of the Nazi Sports Office owing to the war-related shifting of priorities. During this time the NSRL sold lottery tickets as a source of self-financement.

Von Tschammer's influence and power within the NSDAP also began rapidly eroding despite having been a committed topmost Nazi leader. He would, however, never witness Germany's defeat and humiliation in the war, for he died from pneumonia in Berlin in March 1943. Arno Breitmeyer, a fellow SA officer became the new Reichssportführer.

As the war dragged on, a huge number of members of the many branches of the NSRL, among them youngsters in their early teens, had to go to fight to the fronts. Since players were not available, except in shoddily organized military sports events in scattered frontline locations, sports life in Germany came practically to a standstill. The last von Tschammer und Osten Pokal football trophy was played in Vienna in 1943 and the following two years plunged the NSRL into irrelevance. The once mighty Nazi Sports Body had to give up its weight and its position of pride long before the war was lost.
 
On May 31, 1945, after Nazi Germany's defeat in World War II, the American Military Government issued a special law outlawing the Nazi party and all of its branches. Known as "Law number five", this Denazification decree disbanded the NS Reichsbund für Leibesübungen along with all its facilities and departments.

The disbandment of the NSRL meant that all the sports organizations of Germany had to be established anew during the postwar reconstruction of both West Germany and the DDR. Even after German reunification in 1990, there has never been such a powerful and all-encompassing sports organization in Germany as the DRL/NSRL was at its height.

Structure
As a sports governing body seeking to control and integrate all sport activities in Germany, the DRL/NSRL provided a highly organized structure. This structuralization, whose nationalistic seriousness was often outright theatrical, was in line with the Nazi Party's goal of reminding Germans constantly that they were members of a large extended country. According to Paragraph 2 of the DRL's Statutes: The purpose of the League of the Reich for Physical Exercise is the training of the body and character of Germans grouped together in member organizations through planned physical exercises and care of the national conscience (Volksbewußtsein) in the spirit of the National Socialist state.

Regarding method and purpose, and keeping aside the ideology, the well-ordered and solemn DRL/NSRL system proved itself efficient. The 1936 Summer Olympics, as well as other key events, provided ample opportunity to test the good organization that the Sports Body of the Reich was able to provide. The NSRL's obvious competence succeeded in instilling a spirit of unity and pride among the German sportsmen and women as well as their supporters. Moreover, even if not duly credited, many of the NSRL's systemic improvements in sports are still in use in today's sports organizations.

By Sport

Besides the departments above, certain competences of the NSRL as a league were served by sports federations some of which still exist:

(1) The "Summer Games" include the following games known collectively as "Turnspiele" in German: Schlagball (a German bat-and-ball sport), Fistball,  (closely related to korfball), Schleuderball and Ringtennis.

By region
The regional structure of the NSRL followed the Nazi Party model. Often two or more gaue were included in one region where it was expedient to do so.

(1) Thuringia, Anhalt and the Province of Saxony. — (2) Schleswig-Holstein, Hamburg and Mecklenburg. — (3) The Palatinate and (from 1935 onwards) the Saar Region. — (4) Austria from 1938 onwards.

Distribution of members
By January first 1937, the Nationalsozialistischer Reichsbund für Leibesübungen had 45,096 Associations with 3,582,776 active members (of whom 517,992 were female and 3,064,784 male). On April 1, 1939, there were 44,622 Associations with 3,668,206 active members (of whom 526,084 were female). The sports practiced were the following:

Numbering according to Departments and Departmental Federations.

Events
Championships in the individual types of sports were duly organized by the corresponding associations and federations. Among the events directly organized by the NS Reichsbund für Leibesübungen the most important were:
 The 4th Deutsche Kampfspiele, July 23–29, 1934, in Nürnberg
 Deutsches Turn- und Sportfest, July 26–31, 1938, in Breslau

Trophy names
 The name of today's DFB-Pokal, (Deutscher Fußball-Bund-Pokal or German Football-Federation Cup), first contested in the 1934–35 season, was known between 1935 and 1943 as Tschammer-Pokal after then "Reichssportführer" (Sports Chief of the Reich) Hans von Tschammer und Osten.
 The amateur Länderpokal (DFB), first established in 1909, was known between 1935 and 1942 as Reichsbundpokal.

See also
 1936 Summer Olympics
 1936 Winter Olympics
 The Death Match
 Deutscher Olympischer Sportbund
 Gauliga
 Hitler Youth
 Yacht-Club von Deutschland

Notes and references

 Schlag nach! Wissenswerte Tatsachen aus allen Gebieten. Bibliographisches Institut, Leipzig, 1st ed. 1938 (German version reference)
 Schlag nach! Wissenswerte Tatsachen aus allen Gebieten. Bibliographisches Institut, Leipzig, 3d ed. 1941 (German version reference)

Further reading
 Anti-Semitism at the 1936 Olympics 
 Arno Breitmeyer & Heinrich Hoffmann, Sport und Staat. Im Auftrage des Reichssportführers (2 vols.). .
 Carl Diem, Das Olympiadebuch, Leipzig.
 Werner Gärtner, Volk in Leibesübungen. Deutsches Turn- und Sportfest, Breslau 1938. Commissioned by the Reichssportführer.
 Heinrich Hoffmann, Die Olympischen Spiele 1936, 1936.
 Willi Fr. Könitzer, Olympia 1936, published by the Reichssportverlag, Berlin 1936.
 Friedrich Mildner, Olympia 1936 und die Leibesübungen im Nationalsolzialistischen Staat, Buchvertrieb der Olympiade, Berlin 1936 (2 vols).
 Konrad Sczygiol (Hrsg.), Deutscher Turner-Bund. Seine Gründung, Frankfurt/Tübingen 1950.
 Dieter Steinhöfer, Hans von Tschammer und Osten; Reichssportführer im Dritten Reich, Berlin/München/Frankfurt a. M. 1973, 
 Guido Von Mengden, Umgang mit der Geschichte und mit Menschen, Verlag Bartels & Wernitz.
 Paul Wolff, Was ich bei den Oympischen Spielen sah, Karl Specht Verlag, Berlin 1936.

External links 
 

Defunct sports governing bodies in Germany
Nazi Party organizations
1934 establishments in Germany
Sports organizations established in 1934
Organizations disestablished in 1945
Sports governing bodies